Rump may refer to:
 Rump (animal)
 Buttocks
 Rump steak, slightly different cuts of meat in Britain and America
 Rump kernel, software run in userspace that offers kernel functionality in NetBSD

Politics
Rump cabinet
Rump legislature
Rump organization
Rump Parliament, an English parliament formed in 1648
Rump party
Rump Senate, during the Twelfth Texas Legislature
Rump state; see List of rump states

Surname
 Carsten Rump (born 1981), German footballer
 Ernst Rump (born 1872-1921), German merchant, art patron and collector
 Gerhard Charles Rump (born 1947), German art historian and theorist
 Godtfred Rump (1816-1880), Danish painter
 Ragnar Rump (born 1991), Estonian football player